A number of ships of the Royal Navy have been named HMS Stirling Castle (sometimes spelled 'Sterling') after Stirling Castle in Scotland, including:

 , a 70-gun third-rate ship of the line, launched in 1679, and lost off Ramsgate in Kent in 1703.
 , a 70-gun third-rate ship of the line launched in 1705, hulked in 1739 and broken up in 1771.
 , a 70-gun third-rate ship of the line launched in 1742 and lost in 1762.
 , a 64-gun third-rate ship of the line launched in 1775 and lost in 1780.
 , a 74-gun third-rate ship of the line launched in 1811, and hulked in 1839.
 , an auxiliary patrol paddler launched in 1900, and sunk in the Mediterranean in 1916.

Royal Navy ship names